Agonopterix exquisitella is a moth in the family Depressariidae. It was described by Aristide Caradja in 1920. It is found in south-eastern Siberia.

References

Moths described in 1920
Agonopterix
Moths of Asia